Alexander Mountbatten, 1st Marquess of Carisbrooke,  (born Prince Alexander Albert of Battenberg; 23 November 1886 – 23 February 1960) was a British Royal Navy officer, a member of the Hessian princely Battenberg family and the last surviving grandson of Queen Victoria.

Early life

Prince Alexander was born in 1886 at Windsor Castle in Berkshire and was educated at Wellington College and at the Britannia Royal Naval College. His father was Prince Henry of Battenberg, the son of Prince Alexander of Hesse and by Rhine and Julie née Countess of Hauke. His mother was Princess Beatrice of the United Kingdom, the fifth daughter and the youngest child of Queen Victoria and Prince Albert.

Prince Henry of Battenberg was the product of a morganatic marriage and took his style of Prince of Battenberg from his mother, Julia von Hauke, who was created Princess of Battenberg in her own right. At his birth, Alexander was styled His Serene Highness Prince Alexander of Battenberg because the child of a morganatic marriage is ineligible for "Grand-Ducal Highness" status. However, three weeks after his birth, on 13 December 1886, he was styled His Highness under a Royal Warrant passed by his grandmother Queen Victoria.

He was baptised in the White Drawing Room of Windsor Castle on 18 December 1886.  His godparents were Queen Victoria of the United Kingdom, (his maternal grandmother), Prince Alexander of Hesse and by Rhine (his paternal grandfather), the Prince of Wales (his maternal uncle), Prince Alexander of Battenberg (his paternal uncle), and Princess Irene of Hesse and by Rhine (his maternal first cousin and paternal second cousin).

Prince Alexander was the brother-in-law to Alfonso XIII of Spain, who married Alexander's sister, Princess Victoria Eugenia, in 1906.

Military service and honours
Prince Alexander passed a qualifying examination to become service cadet in the Royal Navy in March 1902, and subsequently joined the cadet training ship HMS Britannia at Dartmouth on 8 May 1902. He served in the Royal Navy from 1902 to 1908 and in 1910, became one of the earliest members of The Castaways' Club, an exclusive dining club for Naval officers who resigned while still junior but who wished to keep in touch with their former service. Several of his Mountbatten cousins were also subsequently members, including his first cousins once removed the Marquess of Milford Haven and Duke of Edinburgh. On 11 July 1908, he was awarded the Grand Cross of the Hessian Merit Order of Philip the Magnanimous.

In 1909, he joined the British Army, being appointed Second Lieutenant (on probation) in the Grenadier Guards on 4 August 1909. He was confirmed in the rank on 22 November 1911, and was promoted to Lieutenant on 15 August 1913. He was seconded to the staff to act as an extra aide-de-camp on 10 April 1915 and promoted to captain the same year.

On 1 June 1917, he was authorised to wear the insignia of the Russian Order of St Vladimir, fourth class with Swords, awarded "for distinguished service to the Allied cause." He resigned his commission on 19 June 1919 and was placed on the General Reserve of Officers, ranking as a Captain with seniority of 15 July 1915. He held several other foreign orders and decorations: Grand Cross and Collar of Order of Charles III (Spain), Order of Leopold, with swords (Belgium), Order of Saint Alexander Nevsky (Russia), Order of Naval Merit, fourth class (Spain), Order of the Nile (Egypt), Order of the Crown (Romania), and Croix de Guerre, with palms (France).

During World War II, despite being in his mid-fifties, the Marquess joined the Royal Air Force and was commissioned an acting pilot officer on 6 June 1941. On 6 August, he was regraded as a pilot officer (on probation). He was confirmed in his rank on 6 June 1942 and was promoted to flying officer (war-substantive) on 6 August 1942. During the war, he was a staff officer attached to air chief marshal Sir Trafford Leigh-Mallory. He relinquished his commission on 21 May 1945, retaining the rank of flight lieutenant.

Marquess of Carisbrooke
Anti-German feeling during World War I led George V to change the name of the Royal House in July 1917 from the House of Saxe-Coburg-Gotha to the House of Windsor. He also relinquished, on behalf of his various relatives who were British subjects, the use of all German titles and styles.

The Battenberg family relinquished their titles of Prince and Princess of Battenberg and the styles of Highness and Serene Highness. Under royal warrant, they instead took the surname Mountbatten, an Anglicised form of Battenberg. As such, Prince Alexander became Sir Alexander Mountbatten. On 7 November 1917, he was created Marquess of Carisbrooke, Earl of Berkhamsted and Viscount Launceston.

In the 1930s, author E.F. Benson dedicated two of his famous novels, Mapp and Lucia and Lucia's Progress, to the Marquess of Carisbrooke.

Marriage
On 19 July 1917, he married Lady Irene Denison (4 July 1890 – 16 July 1956), the only daughter of the 2nd Earl of Londesborough and Lady Grace Adelaide Fane, at the Chapel Royal of St James's Palace.

Lord and Lady Carisbrooke had one child, a daughter:
Lady Iris Mountbatten (13 January 1920 – 1 September 1982)

According to the published diaries of Cecil Beaton, in his later years Lord Carisbrooke had a longtime male lover, Simon Fleet. More is written about Lord Carisbrooke and his wife in the published diaries of James Lees-Milne and Henry "Chips" Channon.

Later career
Lord Carisbrooke, who received no state allowance, became the first member of the British royal family to work in the commercial sector. He began his career working as an entry-level clerk in the offices of Lazard Brothers bankers. He later worked for a company that oversaw housing estates, and before long he took control of social work for the tenants.
Later he became a director of Lever Brothers and several other prominent corporations.

Death

Lord Carisbrooke, died in 1960, aged 73, at Kensington Palace, and his ashes were buried within the Battenberg Chapel in St. Mildred's Church, Whippingham on the Isle of Wight. The title Marquess of Carisbrooke became extinct upon his death.

Ancestry

References

1886 births
1960 deaths
Knights Grand Cross of the Order of the Bath
Knights Grand Cross of the Royal Victorian Order
Recipients of the Order of St. Vladimir, 4th class
Carisbrooke
Peers created by George V
People educated at Wellington College, Berkshire
Bailiffs Grand Cross of the Order of St John
Alexander
German princes
British people of German descent
Graduates of Britannia Royal Naval College
Royal Navy officers
Burials at St. Mildred's Church, Whippingham